Francis Joseph Aguilar (August 19, 1932 – February 17, 2013) was an American scholar of strategic planning and general management. He joined the faculty of Harvard Business School in 1964 and became a tenured professor there in 1971. He served as consultant to many firms and on the boards of Dynamic Research Corporation and Bentley University.

His publications include: Scanning the Business Environment (1967), European Problems in General Management (with Edmund P. Learned and Robert C.K. Kaltz, 1963) and General Managers in Action (1988, 1992).

He graduated from RPI and Harvard Business School.

Archives and records
Francis J. Aguilar papers at Baker Library Special Collections, Harvard Business School

References

1932 births
2013 deaths
Harvard Business School faculty
Rensselaer Polytechnic Institute alumni
Harvard Business School alumni